Galyaság is a small ethnographical region of Borsod-Abaúj-Zemplén County in Hungary. It is usually described by its central region. In a more tighten manner it includes the Northern and Southern attachemments also.

Central region 

Only five settlements belong to this category. Three of them are in the valley of Rét between Aggtelek Karst and the Mountains of Rudabánya. These are Égerszög, Teresztenye and Szőlősardó. The other two are North from these on the hills in the nearby. These villages are Tornakápolna and Varbóc.

Northern Part 

 Perkupa (with Dobódél)
 Szögliget and Derenk
 Szin
 Szinpetri
 Jósvafő
 Aggtelek

Southern Part 

 Imola
 Kánó
 Alsótelekes
 Felsőtelekes

Sources 

 Bogsán Gyula, Koleszár Krisztián: Falvak a Galyaságban és mellékén. Galyasági Településszövetség, Perkupa, 2002. .

Geography of Borsod-Abaúj-Zemplén County